Redon Danaj (born 6 August 2000) is an Albanian professional footballer who plays as a midfielder for Kastrioti.

Career statistics

Club

Notes

References

2000 births
Living people
People from Lezhë
Albanian footballers
Association football midfielders
KF Shënkolli players
KS Kastrioti players
Kategoria e Parë players